The IRA Memorial is a memorial in Killarney, County Kerry, Ireland. The memorial is dedicated to the Kerry 2nd Brigade of the Irish Republican Army that participated in the Irish War of Independence and the Irish Civil War.

History 
When the memorial was erected, there was a debate as to which names should be included. it was decided that the memorial should be dedicated to the Kerry Brigade in general, rather than specific volunteers.

The plinth features a plaque that reads:

There is also a smaller plaque that reads:

In 1999 another plaque was unveiled on the site:

References 

Monuments and memorials in the Republic of Ireland
Outdoor sculptures in Ireland
Sculptures of men in Ireland
Irish Republican Army memorials
Killarney